Eric "Fritz" McDonald Snow (19 April 1898 – 24 July 1974) was a New Zealand rugby union player who represented the All Blacks between 1928 and 1929. His position of choice was loose forward.

Career 
Snow played thirty-four times for the now defunct Nelson province.

He was first selected for the national side on their tour of South Africa in 1928, where he played in nine matches.

Snow was further chosen for the 1929 tour of Australia. He played seven matches, and appeared in all three tests. He scored three points (a try) in a non-test game.

Personal 
After retiring from playing, Snow was on the Nelson club committee. He also served as club captain, selector and coach. Two brothers Herbert (Herb) and Vernon also played for Nelson.

References
The Encyclopaedia of New Zealand Rugby by Ron Palenski, Rod Chester & Neville McMillan, pages 196 (4th edition 2005, Hodder Moa Beckett, Auckland)  

1898 births
1974 deaths
New Zealand rugby union players
New Zealand international rugby union players
People from Nelson, New Zealand
Rugby union players from Nelson, New Zealand